Sarrebourg station is a railway station serving the town Sarrebourg, Moselle department, northeastern France. It is situated on the Paris–Strasbourg railway. The station is served by regional trains towards Strasbourg, Metz and Nancy.

References

External links
 

Railway stations in Moselle (department)